Cervalces latifrons, the broad-fronted moose, or the giant moose was a giant species of deer that inhabited the holarctic regions of Europe and Asia during the Pleistocene epoch. It is believed to be the largest species of deer that ever existed, larger than its North American relative Cervalces scotti, Megaloceros, and the modern moose.

Description

Cervalces latifrons was first described by Mr Randall Johnson in 1874. A frontal bone attached to part of an antler of a previously unknown species of deer was found at low tide on the beachfront at Happisburgh, Norfolk, in the "Forest Bed". Johnson, who retained the specimen in his collection, named it Cervus latifrons, Cervus being the only genus of deer known at that time. The specific name "latifrons" refers to the wide frontal bone of this large species. The morphology of the animal as deduced from this fossil and from others later found in this formation and in continental Europe differs little from modern moose. It was later placed in the genus Cervalces which it shares with the also extinct Cervalces scotti from North America. The antlers of the males had short beams and large palmate lobes with up to ten large points. They were probably for display purposes to impress the female rather than for fighting because these moose are believed to have roamed as solitary individuals. The average sized Cervalces latifrons was quite a bit more massive than other large moose-like deer, such Cervalces scotti, the largest races of the extant moose and the Irish elk (Megaloceros giganteus), despite some overlap in shoulder height, and is the largest deer ever known to exist.

Distribution and habitat

Fossil remains of this deer are known from northern Europe and Asia but have not been found in the Iberian Peninsula, Italy south of the Apennines, Croatia or Greece. In the United Kingdom, it is known only from the Cromer Forest Bed Formation. This is exposed at intervals along the coast of Norfolk and Suffolk and forms low cliffs between Cromer and Great Yarmouth. The holotype came from here. It is believed that Cervalces latifrons resembled its modern moose relations and lived in tundra, steppes, coniferous forests and swamps. It probably avoided deciduous forests because of the inconvenience that would be caused by its wide antlers when moving among bushes and saplings. Like its living relatives, it is likely to have lived a solitary life. It is believed to have fed on rough herbage and plants growing around lakes and swamps. Further remains of Cervalces latifrons have been recovered from Sénèze (Haute-Loire, France), Mauer (Baden-Württemberg, Germany), Bilshausen (Niedersachsen, Germany), Mosbach (Hessen, Germany), Süßenborn (Thüringen, Germany), Ranica (Lombardy, Italy), Leffe (Lombardy, Italy) and Crostolo Creek (Emilia-Romagna, Italy) and extensively from Siberia.

Evolutionary history
Fossils of large moose-like deer found in Siberia dating from the most recent glaciation are fragmentary and lack intact skulls and complete antlers but they have tentatively been identified as Cervalces latifrons. They had less advanced teeth, a more specialist muzzle and larger antlers that were bi-lobed and four pronged. They seem to have played a bridging role, crossing the land bridge to Alaska and eventually evolving into Cervalces scotti in North America. They were faced with predators well capable of tackling a moose, the steppe brown bear in Eurasia and the short-faced bear in North America. In Europe, three paleospecies of moose seem to have followed each other chronologically. It is not clear whether Cervalces latifrons evolved into modern moose or whether it died out in the last glacial period.

Ecology
A palaeobotanical study was made of clay found inside the skull of a specimen of Cervalces latifrons found at Fornaci di Ranica in northern Italy dating back to the early Pleistocene. The site was fluvial deposits in the basin of the Serio River. The infrared spectrum of the clay and the pollen grains found in it were compared with a previously available chronological sequence of pollens from sediments in the area. The results suggest that the vegetation in the region at the time in which the moose lived consisted of sparse coniferous forests with Pinus sylvestris and Pinus mugo, steppes and grassland. In the immediate vicinity, it correlated with a retreat of forest cover and an increase in herbaceous ground cover. The valley bottoms probably had standing water, marsh vegetation, moist meadows, bushes and flowering plants. A morpho-functional analysis of Cervalces latifrons comparing it with its modern deer relatives, Cervus spp., suggests similarities in diet and in adaptations for living in a marshy environment with scattered scrub and debris.

Biology

Cervalces latifrons shares many anatomical features with its living relative, the moose (British English "elk", Alces alces) with similarities in its grinding molars, narrow jaw, large mouth cavity, elongated muzzle and premaxillary bones. It is likely to have had a similar diet of bark, leaves and shoots of trees such as willow, aspen, rowan, birch, oak, larch and pine. It would also have grazed herbaceous vegetation in the boggy areas on the floors of valleys. Its limbs were long and show adaptations allowing for locomotion at a fast trot known as "stilt-locomotion". This involves a long stride with a high elevation of the feet at each step. This gait is helpful for moving through bogs or deep snow. The toes could be spread widely which would have aided swimming and prevented the foot sinking deeply when walking in marshy conditions.

References

Cervalces
Prehistoric deer
Pleistocene even-toed ungulates
Pleistocene mammals of Europe
Pleistocene mammals of Asia
Fossil taxa described in 1874
Mammals described in 1874